The Agency for Information Society of Republika Srpska is institution responsible for monitoring the development of information society and promoting the use of information and communication technologies. Supervision of the agency, on behalf of the Republika Srpska is performed by the Ministry of Science and Technology.

Establishment 
Pursuant to the provisions of the law on the government of the Republika Srpska and the law on the Public Service System, the government of the Republika Srpska adopted a decision on the establishment of the Public Institution "Information Society Agency of the Republika Srpska, at its session held on 26 December 2007". By adopting this act, the Republika Srpska got an institution in charge of monitoring and developing the information society, as well as promoting the use of information-communication technologies. The Ministry of Science and Technology shall monitor the operation of the agency, on behalf of the government of the Republika Srpska.

Activity 
The agency has the following mandates and tasks: 

 Coordination of development of information science and the Internet in cooperation with other relevant bodies in public administration, education and health system
 Proposing and implementing measures in building local governance bodies' information systems (city and town assemblies) that enable communication with the Republic organs and the application of uniform program solutions as much as possible
 Licensing and certification of public key infrastructure bodies
 Issuing licenses and certificates, consultancy and training for civil servants and assessment of their IT skills
 Coordination of the work on the establishment of a single database for state bodies and local governance bodies in the Republika Srpska
 Defines the concept of interconnection rules for information inter-operations
 Professional verification of ICT projects in the public sector, primarily in administration
 Development of legislation and preparation of draft regulations and general acts in the field of application of informatics and Internet in public administration, business environment and education, and undertakes measures for their implementation (legislation)
 Determination of technology standards and work process standards in the information and Internet application field and undertakes measures for their implementations
 Promotion of application of new technologies and creation of new businesses in the information sector
 Monitoring of promulgation of acts and implementation of regulations in the infrastructure and business operation fields
 Follows up, provides advice on international agreements related to ICT, foreign investments in ICT
 Provision of advisory support in Cybercrime fields
 Initiates and coordinates the establishment of development centers, techno-parks and production cluster links in the ICT field
 Promotion of the information society within the education system reform and coordination of implementation of public projects that are related to the participation of ICT in the education process
 Accreditation of education and examination centers, in cooperation with the Ministry of Education and Culture, which enables certification of citizens in the ICT field through a post-education form and lifelong learning
 Determination of standards and procedures and issuing of approvals for the procurement of equipment and program solutions, performance of works and provision of information and Internet services for the needs of the public administration and the public sector
 Development of a joint computer-telecommunication network of public institutions and other information and Internet resources owned by the Republic
 Monitoring of Internet developments in the world, adjustment of our needs, as well as everyday utilization of the Internet in state management, public sector and business operations
 Development of methodology, technology and organization of information system development in Republic bodies
 Setting up standards and procedures, and undertaking measures to ensure the information system data protection
 Improvement of the long-term planning and management of the information-telecommunication and Internet infrastructure
 Implementation and coordination of projects aiming to reduce the "technological gap" between B&H and developed countries, B&H and its entities and regions, as well as among different social groups in the RS
 Monitoring achievements in other countries or associations of countries in this field and performance of needed harmonization
 Monitoring and encouraging the development of the information and communication technologies (software, engineering, hardware and consulting), particularly in small and medium size companies
 Promotion of equal development of information society, including remote (rural) areas
 Assistance in meeting the conditions for European and regional integrations in the ICT field, and development of information society

As of 2011, the agency is responsible for the implementation of Information security law, measures and standards, as well as first CERT body in Bosnia and Herzegovina.

Mission 
The agency for Information Society of Republika Srpska will be the key factor in construction of basis of information society in Republika Srpska through: 
 introduction of new electronic services for economy and citizens
 planning, organisation, implementation and coordination of informatics projects in fields of public administration, education system, health care
 defining concepts and interconnection rules for informatics interoperativity
 establishing standards and procedures and undertaking steps for security and protection of data
 role of national certificate authority in infrastructure of public keys
 overlooking and fomenting of development of IT and CT industry
 combating high-tech criminal and software piracy
 measuring IT influence via development of information society

External links 
 Official Agency for information Society of Republika Srpska presentation
 Agency for Information Society of Republika Srpska laws and regulations

Organizations based in Republika Srpska